The Professor of Divinity at Gresham College, London, gives free educational lectures to the general public. The college was founded for this purpose in 1597, when it appointed seven professors; this has since increased to ten and in addition the college now has visiting professors.

The Professor of Divinity is always appointed by the City of London Corporation.

List of Gresham Professors of Divinity
Note, years given as, say, 1596/7 refer to Old Style and New Style dates.

References
 Gresham College website Texts and video of recent lectures
 Gresham College old website, Internet Archive List of professors

Notes

Further reading
 

Divinity
1596 establishments in England